The 2019–20 Washington Huskies women's basketball team represented University of Washington during the 2019–20 NCAA Division I women's basketball season. The Huskies are led by third-year head coach Jody Wynn. The Huskies play their home games at Alaska Airlines Arena at Hec Edmundson Pavilion in Seattle, Washington as members of the Pac-12 Conference.

Roster

Schedule

|-
!colspan=9 style=| Non-conference regular season

|-
!colspan=9 style=| Pac-12 regular season

|-
!colspan=9 style=| Pac-12 Women's Tournament

Rankings

See also
2018–19 Washington Huskies men's basketball team

References

Washington Huskies women's basketball seasons
Washington Huskies women
Washington Huskies basketball, women
Washington Huskies basketball, women